Jamal ad-Din, Jamal ud-Din or Jamal al-Din, meaning 'Beauty of the Faith', is a male Muslim name formed from the elements Jamal and ad-Din. In Egyptian pronunciation it appears as Gamal el-Din or in similar forms. In Bosnian usage it is usually written Džemaludin. It may also refer to:

Government and politics
Jamal ad-Din I (fl. mid-14th century), provincial governor in Ethiopia
Jamal al-Din al-Ustadar (died 1411), emir in Egypt
Jamal ad-Din II (died 1433), Ethiopian ruler
Jamal al-Din al-Afghani (1838–1897), Islamic political activist
Mehmet Cemaleddin Efendi (1848–1917), senior judge of the Ottoman Empire
Djamaluddin Malik (1917–1970), Indonesian film producer and politician
Jamaluddin Jarjis (1951–2015), Malaysian politician
Ahmed Gamal El-Din Moussa (born 1951), Egyptian politician and lawyer
Gamal El Deen Muhammad Hosni Sayed Mubarak, or just Gamal Mubarak (born 1963), Egyptian politician
Iyad Jamal Al-Din (born 1961), Iraqi politician
Abdel Ahad Gamal El Din, Egyptian politician
Khairy Jamaluddin, Malaysian politician

Sports
Džemaludin Mušović (born 1944), Bosnian football manager
Džemaludin or Džemal Hadžiabdić (born 1963), Bosnian footballer
Djamolidine Abdoujaparov (born 1964), Uzbek racing cyclist
Dzhamaldin Khodzhaniyazov (born 1996), Russian footballer
Jameleddine Limam (born 1967), Tunsian footballer
Jamaluddin (cricketer) (born 1985), Pakistani cricketer
Jamaluddin Ahmed (born 1977), Bangladeshi cricketer
Rifat Zhemaletdinov (born 1996), Russian footballer
Timur Zhamaletdinov (born 1997), Russian footballer

Writers
Jamal-ud-Din Hansvi (c. 1187–c. 1261), Afghan scholar, poet, Sufi
Jamal al-Din Yusuf bin al-Amir Sayf al-Din Taghribirdi, or just Ibn Taghribirdi (1410–1470), Egyptian historian
Djamaluddin Adinegoro (1904–1967), Indonesian journalist
Jamal-ud-din Abro, or just Jamal Abro (1924–2004), Sindhi writer
Yousef Gamal El-Din (born 1985), Swiss-Egyptian journalist and television personality

Other
Jamal ad-Din Bukhari (fl. 1260s), Persian astronomer
Jamal-ud-Din Yaqut (fl. early died 1240), Abyssinian slave who rose to a position of influence in the Delhi Sultanate
Jamal al-Din al-Isnawi (1304-1370), a Shafi'i jurist and Qur'anic exegete
Jamal ad-Din Hasan ibn Yusuf ibn 'Ali ibn Muthahhar al-Hilli (1250–1325), Iraqi Twelver Shi'a theologian
Jamal al-Din Hamdan (fl. 1860), Lebanese Druze Sheikh
Džemaludin Čaušević (1870–1938), Bosniak reformer and imam
Jamaaladeen Tacuma (born 1956), (adopted name), American jazz bassist
Jamal Udeen Al-Harith (1966–2017), British Muslim imprisoned in Guantanamo
M. Jamal Deen (born 1955), Guyanese IT professor working in Canada

Arabic masculine given names